The 2015–16 season is PAS Giannina F.C.'s 21st competitive season in the top flight of Greek football, 6th season in the Super League Greece, and 50th year in existence as a football club. They also compete in the Greek Cup.

Players 
updated:30/6/2016

International players

Foreign players

Personnel

Management

Coaching staff

medical staff

Academy

Transfers

Summer

In

Out 

For recent transfers, see List of Greek football transfers summer 2015

Winter

In

Out 

For recent transfers, see -

Pre-season and friendlies 
   The match was held to Giorgos Priskas' memorial.

Competitions

Super League Greece

League table

Results summary

Fixtures

Greek cup 
PAS Giannina will enter the Greek Cup at the Group stage.

Group A

Matches

Round of 16

Statistics

Appearances 

Super League Greece

Goalscorers 

Super League Greece

Clean sheets

Best goal and MVP awards winners

Disciplinary record

Awards 
Nomination for Best Manager in Greece:Giannis Petrakis

References

External links 

 Official Website

PAS Giannina F.C. seasons
Greek football clubs 2015–16 season